Leniko Boucher (born 13 December 1997) is a Barbadian cricketer. He made his List A debut for Barbados in the 2018–19 Regional Super50 tournament on 4 October 2018. He made his Twenty20 debut on 8 September 2019, for the Barbados Tridents, in the 2019 Caribbean Premier League. In October 2019, he was selected to play for Barbados in the 2019–20 Regional Super50 tournament.

In July 2020, he was named in the St Lucia Zouks squad for the 2020 Caribbean Premier League.

References

External links
 

1997 births
Living people
Barbadian cricketers
Barbados cricketers
Barbados Royals cricketers
Saint Lucia Kings cricketers
Place of birth missing (living people)